Bharatvarsh  is an Indian television historical documentary series, hosted by actor-director Anupam Kher on Hindi news channel ABP News. It started on 20 August 2016. The show presents thoughts and ideologies of personalities in the 5000-year old history of India and showcases journey from ancient India to the 19th century. Season 1 finished on 23 October 2016. Season 2 will start after some interval.

Cast
 Tej Sapru as Chanakya
 Aham Sharma as Ashoka
 Rohit Bakshi as Chandragupta Maurya
 Ashish Kapoor as Prithviraj Chauhan
 Astha Agarwal as Sanyogita
 Mohammed Iqbal Khan as Akbar
 Shiva Rindani as Hemu
 Rohit Purohit as Dara Shukoh
 Sudhanshu Pandey as Shivaji
 Bhavesh Balchandani as Young Shivaji
 Gavie Chahal as Aurangzeb
 Sachin Shroff as Adi Shankara
 Amar Sharma as Shah Jahan

Episodes

Season 1

Reception
The show was well received. One episode of Buddha was telecasted in Delhi Public School Ghaziabad for students. The episode on Chanakya was screened in Little Angels Convent H S School, Kohe Fiza, Bhopal. In October 2016, Juggernaut Books and ABP News announced the publication of a book based on Bharatvarsh, which will be published in the first quarter of 2017.

Social media
The show noticed a huge engagement on social media with the #भारतवर्ष trending on Twitter. The hash-tag was promoted heavily by ABP News through a contest on Twitter. The lucky winners of the #भारतवर्ष contest were given Karbonn K9 smartphone.

See also
 Pradhanmantri
 7 RCR (TV Series)
 Bharat Ek Khoj
 Mahakavi Series

References

External links
 Bharatvarsh on ABP News
 Bharatvarsh contest Terms and Conditions

Hindi-language television shows
Television series about the history of India
2016 Indian television series debuts
Indian documentary television series
2016 Indian television series endings
ABP News original programming
Mughal Empire in fiction
Cultural depictions of Gautama Buddha
Cultural depictions of Akbar
Cultural depictions of Shah Jahan
Television series about Buddhism
Cultural depictions of Aurangzeb
Cultural depictions of Shivaji
Cultural depictions of Indian monarchs
Memorials to Ashoka
Adi Shankara
Memorials to Maharana Pratap
Cultural depictions of Ashoka